Lioujiao Township is a rural township in Chiayi County, Taiwan.

History
After the World War II in 1945, Lioujiao Township Office was established on 18 January 1946 as part of Dongshan Township, Tainan County. On 25 October 1950, Lioujiao Township was readjusted to be part of Chiayi County.

Geography
It has a population total of 21,506 and an area of 62.2619 square kilometres.

Administrative divisions
Bengshan, Fongmei/Fengmei, Gangmei, Gengliao, Gongchang, Gulin, Lioudou/Liudou, Lioujiao/Liujiao, Liounan/Liunan, Lunyang, Sanyi, Shuanghan, Suannan, Suantou, Suandong/Suantung, Sucuo, Tanci/Tanqi, Tushih/Tushi, Wanbei, Wannan, Sicuo/Xicuo, Yongsian/Yongxian, Yuliao, Jhengyi/Zhengyi and Jhuben/Zhuben Village.

Tourist attractions
 Tomb of General Wang De-lu
 Zhecheng Cultural Park

Transportation
 Beigang Tourist Bridge

Notable natives
 Liao Cheng-hao, Minister of Justice (1996–1998)

References

External links

 Lioujiao Township Office

Townships in Chiayi County